Walter Kohn (March 9, 1923 – April 19, 2016) was an Austrian-American theoretical physicist and theoretical chemist.
He was awarded, with John Pople, the Nobel Prize in Chemistry in 1998. The award recognized their contributions to the understandings of the electronic properties of materials. In particular, Kohn played the leading role in the development of density functional theory, which made it possible to calculate quantum mechanical electronic structure by equations involving the electronic density (rather than the many-body wavefunction). This computational simplification led to more accurate calculations on complex systems as well as many new insights, and it has become an essential tool for materials science, condensed-phase physics, and the chemical physics of atoms and molecules.

Early years in Canada
Kohn arrived in England as part of the Kindertransport rescue operation immediately after the annexation of Austria by Hitler. He was from a Jewish family, and has written, "My feelings towards Austria, my native land, are – and will remain – very painful. They are dominated by my vivid recollections of 1 1/2 years as a Jewish boy under the Nazi regime, and by the subsequent murder of my parents, Salomon and Gittel Kohn, of other relatives and several teachers, during the Holocaust. ...  I want to mention that I have a strong Jewish identity and – over the years – have been involved in several Jewish projects, such as the establishment of a strong program of Judaic Studies at the University of California in San Diego.". Kohn also has identified as Deist.

Because he was an Austrian national, he was transferred to Canada in July 1940 after the outbreak of World War II. As a 17-year-old, Kohn traveled as part of a British convoy moving through U-boat-infested waters to Quebec City in Canada; and from there, by train, to a camp in Trois-Rivières. He was at first held in detention in a camp near Sherbrooke, Quebec. This camp, as well as others, provided a small number of educational facilities that Kohn used to the fullest, and he finally succeeded in entering the University of Toronto. As a German national, the future Nobel Laureate in Chemistry was not allowed to enter the chemistry building, and so he opted for physics and mathematics.

Scientific career
Kohn received a war-time bachelor's degree in applied mathematics at the end of his one-year army service, having completed only 2½ out of the 4-year undergraduate program, from the University of Toronto in 1945; he was awarded an M.A. degree in applied mathematics by Toronto in 1946. Kohn was awarded a Ph.D. degree in physics by Harvard University in 1948, where he worked under Julian Schwinger on the three-body scattering problem. At Harvard he also fell under the influence of Van Vleck and solid state physics.

He moved from Harvard to Carnegie Mellon University from 1950 to 1960, after a short stint in Copenhagen as a National Research Council of Canada post-doctoral fellow. At Carnegie Mellon he did much of his seminal work on multiple-scattering band-structure work, now known as the KKR method. His association with Bell Labs got him involved with semiconductor physics, and produced a long and fruitful collaboration with Luttinger (including, for example, development of the Luttinger-Kohn model of semiconductor band structure). In 1960 he moved to the newly founded University of California, San Diego, held a term as the physics department chair, and remained until 1979. It was during this period, he, along with his student Chanchal Kumar Majumdar developed the Kohn–Majumdar theorem related to Fermi gas and its bound and unbound states. He then accepted the Founding Director's position at the new Institute for Theoretical Physics in Santa Barbara. He took his position as a professor in the Physics Department at the University of California at Santa Barbara in 1984; where he worked until the end of his life.

Kohn made significant contributions to semiconductor physics, which led to his award of the Oliver E. Buckley Prize by the American Physical Society. He was also awarded the Feenburg medal for his contributions to the many-body problem.
His work on density functional theory was initiated during a visit to the École Normale Supérieure in Paris, with Pierre Hohenberg, and was prompted by a consideration of alloy theory. The
Hohenberg–Kohn theorem was further developed, in collaboration with Lu Jeu Sham, to produce the Kohn-Sham equations. The latter is the standard work horse of modern materials science, and even used in quantum theories of plasmas.
In 2004, a study of all citations to the Physical Review  journals from 1893 until 2003, found Kohn to be an author of five of the 100 papers with the "highest citation impact", including the first two.

In 1957, he relinquished his Canadian citizenship and became a naturalized citizen of the United States.

In 1963 Kohn became a Member of the American Academy of Arts and Sciences, a Member of the National Academy of Sciences in 1969, and a member of the American Philosophical Society in 1994. In 2011, he became an honorary member of the Austrian Academy of Sciences (ÖAW). He was also a Member of the International Academy of Quantum Molecular Science.

Death
Kohn died on April 19, 2016, at his home in Santa Barbara, California from jaw cancer, at the age of 93.

Honors and awards
 Oliver E. Buckley prize in Solid State Physics (American Physical Society, 1961)
 Davisson-Germer Prize (American Physical Society, 1977)
 National Medal of Science (1988)
 Nobel Prize in Chemistry (1998)
 Elected a Foreign Member of the Royal Society (ForMemRS) in 1998
 Austrian Decoration for Science and Art (1999)
 Grand Decoration of Honour in Silver with Star for Services to the Republic of Austria (2008)
 Harvard University awarded him an Honorary Doctor of Science (May 2012)

Selected publications
 W. Kohn, "An essay on condensed matter physics in the twentieth century," Reviews of Modern Physics, Vol. 71, No. 2, pp. S59–S77, Centenary 1999. APS
 W. Kohn, "Nobel Lecture: Electronic structure of matter — wave functions and density functionals," Reviews of Modern Physics, Vol. 71, No. 5, pp. 1253–1266 (1999). APS
 D. Jérome, T.M. Rice, and W. Kohn, "Excitonic Insulator," Physical Review, Vol. 158, No. 2, pp. 462–475 (1967). APS
 P. Hohenberg, and W. Kohn, "Inhomogeneous Electron Gas," Physical Review, Vol. 136, No. 3B, pp. B864–B871 (1964). APS
 W. Kohn, and L. J. Sham, "Self-Consistent Equations Including Exchange and Correlation Effects," Physical Review, Vol. 140, No. 4A, pp. A1133–A1138 (1965). APS
 W. Kohn, and J. M. Luttinger, "New Mechanism for Superconductivity," Physical Review Letters, Vol. 15, No. 12, pp. 524–526 (1965). APS
 W. Kohn, "Theory of the Insulating State," Physical Review, Vol. 133, No. 1A, pp. A171–A181 (1964). APS
 W. Kohn, "Cyclotron Resonance and de Haas-van Alphen Oscillations of an Interacting Electron Gas," Physical Review, Vol. 123, pp. 1242–1244  (1961). APS

See also
 List of Jewish Nobel laureates
 List of Nobel laureates affiliated with the University of California, Santa Barbara
List of refugees

References

External links

"Quantum Chemistry Comes of Age," The Chemical Educator, Vol. 5, No. 3, S1430-4171(99)06333-7, © 2000 Springer-Verlag New York, Inc.
Freeview video interview with Walter Kohn by the Vega Science Trust
 including the Nobel Lecture, January 28, 1999 (a year later) Electronic Structure of Matter – Wave Functions and Density Functionals
Kohn's faculty website at University of California-Santa Barbara. Retrieved November 11, 2006.
Obituary

Further reading 
 

1923 births
2016 deaths
Nobel laureates in Chemistry
American Nobel laureates
Austrian Nobel laureates
Scientists from Vienna
Austrian emigrants to the United States
Kindertransport refugees
20th-century American physicists
20th-century Austrian physicists
American deists
Jewish scientists
National Medal of Science laureates
Harvard University alumni
Foreign Members of the Royal Society
Foreign Members of the Russian Academy of Sciences
Members of the International Academy of Quantum Molecular Science
University of Toronto alumni
University of California, Santa Barbara faculty
Theoretical chemists
American people of Austrian-Jewish descent
Carnegie Mellon University faculty
Austrian Jews
Jewish physicists
Jewish American scientists
Members of the United States National Academy of Sciences
Recipients of the Austrian Decoration for Science and Art
Recipients of the Grand Decoration with Star for Services to the Republic of Austria
UNESCO Niels Bohr Medal recipients
Oliver E. Buckley Condensed Matter Prize winners
Computational chemists
Fellows of the American Physical Society
Deaths from cancer in California
Deaths from jaw cancer
Members of the American Philosophical Society